Mambong may refer to:

Mambong (federal constituency), represented in the Dewan Rakyat
Mambong (state constituency), represented in the Sarawak State Legislative Assembly